Trudie Taljaard (19 March 1948 - 31 January 2009) was a South African actress, theater coach, and casting director. She is best known for the roles in the films Windprints (1989), Hitchhiker (2008) and Hearts & Minds. She founded the drama school, "Another Center for Training Actors" (ACTA). She was playfully known as the 'two-year guarantee aunt' after appearing in a well-known furniture store's commercials for a long time.

Personal life
She was born on 19 March 1948 and grew up in Melville, Johannesburg, South Africa. She graduated with a Bachelor's degree in drama at the University of Pretoria.

She was married to fellow actor Errol Roelofsz. After the divorce, she married the actor Nico Liebenberg. She had three daughters: Marlene, Justine and Eloise from these two marriages.

On 31 January 2009, she died at the age of 60 after being diagnosed with bone cancer in 2007.

Career
Started as a theatre actress, Trudie has performed in the stage plays such as; A Cedar Fall in Waterkloof, The Pencil Thief and the Angel, The Dead, Three Seasons, The Other Man, The Miracle, Raka, Dream Smuggler, and Train Stories. In 1989, she was nominated for the Artes Award. She also performed in the controversial one-man piece Kitchen Blues produced by author Jeanne Goosen. Even though it was controversial, the play received critics acclaim and she was nominated for several awards for her acting, including the Computicket Award in 1991. In 1990, she played the role of "Charlene Brits" in the TV4 comedy serial People Like Us. For that role, she was nominated for several awards and won the Star Tonight! Award for Best Actress in 1991. In the same year, she was nominated for the Dalro Theater Award for Best Actress in an Afrikaans Leading Role and the Fleur du Cap Drama Award. In 1992, she was nominated at the IGI Life for Vita Drama Award for Natal.

Then she acted in many television serials and soap operas such as; Doctor, Doctor, Sun Circle, Home Affairs, Tekwan, The Sorrow Waltz, Eagles III, Suburban Bliss, Pastorie Petals, People Like Us, Dit Wat Stom Is and Saartjie. She also starred in the films such as; Elsa's Secret (1979), Brother Matie (1984), Windprints (1990), The Long Run (2000) and Hitchhiker (2007). In 2008, she played the last television role in the Afrikaans soap opera 7de Laan by playing as matron Netta Nortjé's sister "Esther".

Filmography

References

External links
 IMDb

1948 births
2009 deaths
South African film actresses
South African television actresses
South African stage actresses